Karoophasma biedouwense is a species of insect in the family Mantophasmatidae. It is endemic to the Biedouw Valley of Western Cape Province, South Africa, in a restricted area that includes the settlements of Biedouw, Driefontein, and Wolfdrif.

References

Mantophasmatidae
Insects of South Africa
Endemic fauna of South Africa